Herman Magnus af Petersens, born 1842 - died 1903) was a Swedish hofjægermester (hunting master) and landowner. 

Af Petersens was the son of Captain Carl Herman af Petersens (1801-1843) and Sofia Carolina Dahlqvist (1818-1900). He was the first hofjægermester and owner of the Erstabik estate in Nacka. On 4 July 1889 af Petersens sold 890 hectares from the estate.

Ancestry

References

1842 births
1903 deaths